The United Nations Operation in the Congo (abbreviated to ONUC) was a United Nations peacekeeping force deployed in the Republic of the Congo in 1960 in response to the Congo Crisis. ONUC was the UN's first peacekeeping mission with significant military capabilities and remains one of the largest UN operations in size and scope.

Following its independence from Belgium on 30 June 1960, the Congo descended into chaos and disorder, prompting its former colonial power to invade under the pretext of restoring order and protecting Belgian nationals. In response to the Congolese government's appeal for assistance, on 14 July 1960 the United Nations Security Council passed Resolution 143 (S/4387) calling upon Belgium to withdraw its troops and authorizing the Secretary-General to provide the Congolese government with military assistance. The first UN troops, drawn mostly from African and Asian states, reached the Congo the following day.

In the face of worsening conditions—including an insurrection in Katanga, the assassination of Prime Minister Patrice Lumumba, the collapse of the central government, and the intervention of foreign mercenaries—ONUC's initial mandate gradually expanded to include protecting the territorial integrity and political independence of the Congo, preventing an impending civil war, and securing the removal of all unauthorized foreign armed forces.

At its peak, UN forces numbered nearly 20,000 military personnel from over two dozen countries, led largely by India, Ireland, and Sweden. During the peak of hostilities between September 1961 and December 1962, ONUC transitioned from a peacekeeping to a military force, engaging in several clashes and offensives against secessionist and mercenary forces. Following the reintegration of Katanga in February 1963, ONUC was gradually phased out, and civilian aid increased, becoming the single largest assistance effort by the UN up to that time. UN personnel were withdrawn entirely on 30 June 1964.

Background 

The Congo became independent on 30 June 1960, but the Belgian commander, Lieutenant General Émile Janssens, refused to rapidly "Africanize" the officers' corps of the Force Publique (the army), resulting in disorder and mutinies just four days after the Congo gained its independence. While the President, Josheph Kasa-Vubu and the Prime Minister, Patrice Lumumba were trying to negotiate with the mutineers, the Belgian government decided to intervene to protect Belgians that remained in the country. The interference from Belgium was seen as neo-colonial aggression from the Congolese government and Lumumba accused the Belgian officers of causing the mutiny and he also accused them of also trying to annex the Congo. Once Belgium received Moïse Tshombé's acceptance, they sent troops to take over Katanga and establish a secession there to protect mining interests. Katanga was rich in minerals and natural resources, contributing to over 60% of the entire nation's raw materials. Katanga had some of the major sources of copper, cobalt, diamonds and uranium in the world, with the uranium being used for the nuclear bomb the US dropped on Hiroshima during World War II.

On 10 July, Belgian troops were sent to Elisabethville, the capital of Katanga, to control the situation and protect Belgian civilians. There were 100,000 Belgians living in the Congo at the time, and many were in a state of panic. The presence of Belgian troops was illegal under international law, as Congolese officials had not requested their presence. With the help of the Belgians, who wrote all his declarations, Tshombé proclaimed the independence of the new State of Katanga over television on 11 July, announcing himself as president. It was widely regarded by critics from around the world that Tshombé was a puppet for the Belgians and their mining interests in Katanga. On 12 July, the President and the Prime Minister asked for help from the UN. The UN Secretary-General, Dag Hammarskjöld addressed the UN Security Council at a night meeting on 13 July and asked the council to act "with utmost speed" on the request.

At the same meeting, the Security Council adopted Resolution 143 (1960), by which it called upon the Government of Belgium to withdraw its troops from the territory of the Congo. The resolution authorized the Secretary-General to facilitate the withdrawal of Belgian troops, maintain law and order, and help to establish and legitimize the post-colonial government in consultation with the Government of the Republic of the Congo. This mission was approved by a Security Council vote eight in favor and none against, with three countries abstaining which included the Republic of China, France and the United Kingdom. Both the United States and Soviet Union voted in favor. This mandate was extended to maintain the territorial integrity of the Congo, particularly through the removal of the foreign mercenaries supporting the secession of Katanga. ONUC's intention was an unprecedented role for a UN peacekeeping force, as it was not self-evidently peacekeeping in nature.

Operations

Deployment 
The United Nations stated four goals for the operation: first, to restore law and order; second, to keep other nations out of the crisis; third, to help build the country's economy; and fourth, to restore stability. A peacekeeping force had landed in the country within 48 hours of the resolution, as well as civilian experts who were tasked with keeping the country's infrastructure operating smoothly.

1960 
Lumumba asked the United Nations to intervene and use military force to stop Tshombe's forces in Katanga. The first UN troops arrived on 15 July, many airlifted by the United States Air Force as part of Operation New Tape. There was instant disagreement between Lumumba and the UN over the new force's mandate. Because the Congolese army had been in disarray since the mutiny, Lumumba wanted to use the UN troops to subdue Katanga by force and when they refused, he saw this as a betrayal to the United Nations' initial plans. Lumumba wrote to UN Secretary General Dag Hammarskjöld that from the text of United Nations Security Council Resolution 143 "it is clear that, contrary to your personal interpretation, the UN force may be used to subdue the rebel government of Katanga". Secretary General Hammarskjöld refused. To Hammarskjöld, the secession of Katanga was an internal Congolese matter, and the UN was forbidden to intervene by Article 2 of the United Nations Charter. He argued that intervening in Katanga would mean the UN would be enforcing parts of the country and it would not be seen as peacekeeping. Disagreements over what the UN force could and could not do continued throughout its deployment.

In response, Lumumba accused the UN of siding with Tshombe and foreign mining companies. Lumumba then asked the Soviet Union for assistance and received aid in the form of trucks and aircraft which deeply concerned the United States and their allies. Using material of the former Force Publique, Lumumba ordered the army to launch an attack on the breakaway Katanga province but failed to take it back. President Joseph Kasa-Vubu dismissed Lumumba on 5 September 1960 which was deeply condemned by the Congo's Houses of Parliament. Lumumba refused to step down. On 14 September Kasa-Vubu dissolved parliament and Joseph Desire Mobutu announced over the radio that he was going to be taking control over the country's military. After Lumumba had been dismissed, the UN general secretary's representative in the city of Léopoldville, Andrew Cormier, instructed that all airfields were to be closed and that the capital's main radio station was to be shut down as well. Lumumba was unable to fly in any troops that were loyal to him and he also lost his only means of mass communication.

By 20 July 1960, 3,500 troops for ONUC had arrived in the Congo. The 3,500 consisted of 460 troops from the Ethiopian Army (later to grow into the Tekil Brigade), 770 troops from the Ghana Armed Forces, 1,250 troops from Morocco and 1,020 troops from the Tunisian Armed Forces. The first contingent of Belgian forces had left Leopoldville on 16 July upon the arrival of the United Nations troops. Following assurances that contingents of the Force would arrive in sufficient numbers, the Belgian authorities agreed to withdraw all their forces from the Leopoldville area by 23 July. The last Belgian troops left the country by 23 July, as United Nations forces continued to deploy throughout the Congo. The buildup continued, ONUC's strength increasing to over 8,000 by 25 July and to over 11,000 by 31 July 1960. Troops had also arrived from countries such as Sweden, Norway, Ireland and Ethiopia. The UN secretary general stated there would be no troops from any of the great nations or from any countries that had an interest in the crisis that was occurring. A basic agreement between the United Nations and the Congolese Government on the operation of the Force was finalized by 27 July.The United Nations set up headquarters in a seven story apartment building which was on the Boulevard d'Albert in the centre of Léopoldville.

On 9 August 1960, politician Albert Kalonji declared the region of south-eastern Kasai, on the Congo's southern border with Portuguese Angola, to be the new Mining State of South Kasai or Autonomous State of South Kasai. The use of the word "state" was deliberately ambiguous, allowing Kalonji to avoid specifying whether the South Kasai claimed to independence as a nation-state in imitation of Katanga, or as a province within the Congo. Due to rejection of requests to the UN for aid to suppress the South Kasai and Katanga revolts, the Lumumba Government decided to request Soviet assistance. De Witte writes that "Leopoldville asked the Soviet Union for planes, lorries, arms, and equipment. ... Shortly afterwards, on 22 or 23 August, about 1,000 soldiers left for Kasai." De Witte goes on to write that on 26–27 August, the ANC seized Bakwanga, Albert Kalonji's capital in South Kasai, without serious resistance. "In the next two days it temporarily put an end to the secession of Kasai."

Bloomfield wrote in 1963 that:

By February 1961, there were four factions in the Congo: Antoine Gizenga (leading Lumumba's followers), Joseph-Desire Mobutu, Tshombe, and the self-appointed King Albert Kalonji. There were four separate armed forces: Mobotu's ANC itself, numbering about 12,000, the South Kasai Constabulary loyal to Albert Kalonji (3,000 or less), the Katanga Gendarmerie which were part of Moise Tshombe's regime (totalling about 10,000), and the Stanleyville dissident ANC loyal to Antoine Gizenga (numbering about 8,000).

1961 
Early in 1961, Patrice Lumumba was assassinated. UN Swedish troops witnessed Lumumba being transferred to the city of Elisabethville after being captured by Mobutu's forces and he was badly bruised and beaten. He was then executed by a Katangan firing squad and his body was dissolved in acid. Jawaharlal Nehru reacted sharply. Calling it "an international crime of the first magnitude", he asked Hammarskjöld to take a tough line. When the Security Council passed a second resolution on 21 February 1961, Nehru agreed to send an Indian Army brigade of some 4,700 troops to the Congo. The 99th Indian Infantry Brigade was thus dispatched. Thus United Nations mission was strengthened and expanded in response, in an effort to keep foreign mercenaries out of country. The second resolution stated it would restore order in the Congo while preventing civil war and it would see over the withdrawal of all foreign advisors in the country. It also stated it would urgently try and reconvene the Congo's parliament. In August of that year, three of the four groups claiming control of the country, Lumumba, Mobutu and Kalonji, reconciled with help from the United Nations. It resulted in the restoration of the country's parliament and prevented the outbreak of a large civil war. Tshombe's breakaway Katanga province was not part of this reconciliation. United Nations forces clashed with Tshombe's foreign mercenaries several times late in the year.

On 17 September 1961, UN Secretary General Dag Hammarskjöld was flying to Rhodesia to negotiate peace talks between the government and Tshombe when Hammarskjöld's plane crashed, killing him. It was a response to the troubled Operation Morthor ongoing at the time. The circumstances of his death were suspicious, and there remains suspicion that his plane was shot down. A recent book by Susan Williams (2011) uncovered evidence that a specially equipped fighter plane from the Belgian-led mercenary force referred to as the Katanga Gendarmerie shot down his plane. Hammarskjöld was succeeded by U Thant.

Swedish troops were assigned to keep order in a huge camp with approximately 40,000 refugees, which hastily grew up in just two weeks during August and September 1961.

After Hammarskjöld's death, his replacement, U Thant, took a more aggressive approach. Removing Tshombe from Katanga became the primary military objective for the UN. In December 1961, UN troops from Sweden, Ireland, India, and Ethiopia were involved in heavy fighting for Katanga's capital, Elizabethville. UN forces eventually managed to defeat the Katangan gendarmes in the city and took Elizabethville. During the fighting, eleven Swedish soldiers were taken prisoner; they were released on 15 January 1962 in exchange for Katangan gendarmes.

In August 1961, under the command of Indian Army's Brigadier-General K.A.S. Raja, the UN launched Operation Rumpunch, a surprise attack that led to the peaceful surrender of 81 foreign mercenaries.

Operation Morthor 

On 13 September 1961, the most obvious example of the transition from peacekeeping to peace enforcement occurred when the Indian ONUC leadership on the ground leading an Indian brigade, launched "Operation Morthor" (Hindi: twist and break) and swiftly took control of Katanga. The operation was meant to be a stepped up version of the earlier Operation Rumpunch. However, Hammarskjöld was not fully informed and did not know the operation was happening.

The operation led to a serious eight-day military engagement between ONUC and the Katangese forces. Tshombe's paid mercenaries were prepared for the UN forces and launched an effective counterattack. Thirteen UN troops were killed as well as 200 Katangese civilians and troops. Operation Morthor was executed with Indian support, but without full approval by several member countries of the UN, particularly the UK, France, and United States. The Soviet Union was angrily accusing the US of supporting the assassination of Lumumba, a Soviet ally, and of installing American ally Mobutu as president. The Soviet state interpreted ONUC to now be acting as a proxy for the US rather than supporting the interests of the entire Security Council.

During the fighting, the UN special representative in Katanga, Conor Cruise O'Brien, accounted that the Katanga secession movement was over. Most observers interpreted that as meaning that the UN military forces had successfully defeated Tshombe's troops, but the announcement was premature in every possible way.

During the operation, a company of 155 Irish UN troops was attacked by Moise Tshombe's forces in Katanga. The Irish were seriously outnumbered and outgunned, but managed to hold out for six days until they finally ran out of ammunition. The Irish managed to inflict heavy losses against Tshombe's foreign mercenaries, without any of their own being killed themselves. This event is known as the Siege of Jadotville.

End of the Katangan secession 

The United Nations launched Operation Unokat in early December 1961, which put pressure on Tshombe to enter serious negotiations with Congolese Prime Minister Cyrille Adoula. On 16 December the attack on Camp Massart took place were the stronghold of the Katangese Gendarmerie was captured. On 21 December Tshombe signed the Kitona Declaration, an agreement whereby he would recognize the authority of the central government and work to reintegrate Katanga into the Republic of the Congo. However, Tshombe subsequently deferred to the Katangan Parliament and put off any action of reconciliation. In January 1962 the rival government of the Free Republic of the Congo was finally subdued and the UN was able to refocus its efforts on ending the Katangan secession. By then contact between the central government and Katanga had broken down, and ONUC intelligence reports indicated that the latter was rebuilding its forces.

In August 1962 Secretary General Thant drew up a "Plan for National Reconciliation" by which Katanga would rejoin a federalized Congo. Adoula and Tshombe both accepted the proposal. Thant was wary of Tshombe's delaying tactics and applied increasing political pressure on the Katangan government to abide by the plan's timetable. Still doubting the likelihood of a peaceful resolution of the Katangan secession, he sent Ralph Bunche to Léopoldville. There, Bunch worked with local UN Mission Chief Robert Gardiner and UN Force Commander Sean MacEoin to create a plan to achieve freedom of movement for ONUC personnel and eliminate the foreign mercenaries. By then it was obvious that Tshombe did not intend on rejoining the Congo; there were 300–500 mercenaries in Katanga (as many as there had been before previous UN operations) and new airfields and defensive positions were being constructed. ONUC personnel and even consuls from troop-contributing supporters of ONUC faced increasing harassment at the hands of Katangan forces.

The situation came to a breaking point on 24 December 1962 when Katangan gendarmes brazenly attacked peacekeeping forces in Katanga, causing Thant to authorize a retaliatory offensive to decisively eliminate secessionist opposition.

Major General Dewan Prem Chand launched Operation Grandslam on 28 December and by the end of the day UN troops had seized downtown Élisabethville. Reinforced by recently amassed air power, United Nations peacekeepers successfully completed the first phase of the operation by the end of the year. In early January the United Nations forces turned their attention towards remaining strongholds in southern Katanga. Indian peacekeepers surpassed their orders and crossed the Lufira River ahead of schedule, generating panic behind the Katangan lines and causing an incident among United Nations leadership. Tshombe, realizing that his position was untenable, sued for peace on 15 January 1963. Two days later he signed an instrument of surrender and declared the Katangan secession to be over.

Final activities 
After Operation Grandslam, the United Nations shrank the force significantly, only keeping a small peacekeeping force in the country.

By autumn 1963 plans were underway to remove the United Nations force from the Congo after the reincorporation of Katanga. At that time six battalions of UN troops were stationed in Katanga, one battalion was at Luluabourg, one at Force Headquarters, and administration personnel were at Leopoldville.

Canadian Brigadier-General Jacques Dextraze was sent to the Congo in 1963, to serve as mission Chief of Staff, effectively deputy to the mission's military commander. The military component headquarters, coordinated by Dextraze, was in the process of planning the mission's withdrawal in early 1964 as the Simba rebellion loomed. Dextraze launched a small-scale operation during Pierre Mulele's Kwilu Province uprising of January 1964 in order to save at least some of the threatened aid workers and missionaries under attack from the jeunesse.
 
In May 1964 troops began to withdraw, beginning with the Irish unit in Kolwezi on 11 May, and ending with units in Leopoldville in June. The United Nations also maintained a large civilian staff of 2000 experts in the country throughout 1963 and 1964. The final group of peacekeepers, 85 men of the First Nigerian Battalion and 58 men of the 57th Canadian Signals, departed Ndjili Airport in Leopoldville on 30 June. The last soldier to leave was UN Force Commander Major General Johnson Aguiyi-Ironsi.

Criticisms of UN involvement 
The UN were criticised numerous times during their involvement during the Congolese crisis about how they handled certain situations such as the death of Lumumba and the secession in Katanga. They suffered from many accusations after the death of the Prime Minister Lumumba as many believed he should have been better protected by the UN. The most well-known demonstration against the UN over Lumumba's death was in New York, when African American protesters pushed their way into the UN building, unsettling the General Assembly; the UN's office in Belgium was also attacked.

The USSR also criticised the UN's involvement, and on 23 December 1960 Khrushchev addressed the General Assembly of the UN, highlighting the operation's controversial political direction along with the accusation that it was responsible for Lumumba's death, its moves favoring Lumumba's political opponents and also their lack of willingness initially to deal with Katanga. Norrie Macqueen writes that the UN's peacekeeping approach in the Congo had no clear place in the Soviets' view.

Khrushchev would go on to criticise the role of the Secretary General within the UN, claiming it was a position that gave one person far too much power. He suggested a radical reform which included abolishing the position of secretary general and replacing it with a troika system. It was inevitably rejected.

National involvement and UN Commanders

Indian Army leadership

On 12 July 1960, after the Security Council adopted a resolution, calling on Belgium to withdraw its forces and the UN to assist the Congolese government, Hammarskjöld appointed as his special representative a senior Indian diplomat, Rajeshwar Dayal, who would later become India's foreign secretary. Lumumba's assassination shocked Jawaharlal Nehru who reacted sharply. Calling it "an international crime of the first magnitude", he asked Hammarskjöld to take a tough line. When the Security Council passed a second resolution on 21 February 1961, Nehru agreed to send an Indian Army brigade of some 4,700 troops to the Congo. Kasavubu and Mobutu took great exception to these moves. They had all along resented Dayal's and Nehru's support for Lumumba. Now they threatened dire consequences for the UN mission if Dayal remained at its helm. At Hammarskjöld's request, Nehru agreed that Dayal should step down.

Indian Army involvement then escalated. On 13 September, the 99th Indian Infantry Brigade launched Operation Morthor (Hindi: twist and break) that swiftly took control of Katanga. The staff officer who planned the operation would later become the chief of the Indian Army: Major Krishnaswamy Sundarji. It was in this context that the British government sought to arrange that fateful meeting between Hammarskjöld and Tshombe in Ndola, ostensibly to negotiate a ceasefire.

On the eve of Operation Rum Punch the UN had 5,720 troops in Katanga; there were 1,600 Indians, 500 Irish, and 400 Swedes in Élisabethville, 1,200 Indians in Albertville, 1,000 Indians at Kamina Base, 500 Indians at Kabalo, 400 Ethiopians and Indians in Manono, and 120 Irish in Jadotville.

Nehru's support for the UN in Congo was significant. India sent more troops than any country, and they were active throughout 1962 in stubbing out the secessionist forces, Indian Army units leading the fight. The UN forces were commanded by Indian officers including Major General Dewan Prem Chand. Even during the war with China, Nehru did not insist on an immediate withdrawal of the Indian brigade, but the Canberra bombers that it had deployed, were called back. The troops returned only after the mission was completed in March 1963.

Malayan Army 

Malaya (now Malaysia) was invited to send a contingent to serve in ONUC. The Prime Minister, Tunku Abdul Rahman Putra, in response to the United Nations' request offered a force of 120 men in a telegram to the Secretary-General on 4 August 1960. On 24 August, in another telegram to New York, the force level was increased to 450 men. Eventually, the force level was settled at 613 all ranks. The name given to this force for service with ONUC was Malayan Special Force or MSF in short. The original force was drawn from two of the finest units in the Federation Army - 4th Battalion, the Royal Malay Regiment and 'C' Squadron 2nd Reconnaissance Regiment (now 2 Armour). It had a complement of 42 officers and 571 other ranks.

Swedish Armed Forces 

Sweden had an active role in the UN forces during the crisis. When Dag Hammarskjöld established UN Mission ONUC he organized it into two parts: one military and one civilian. The Swedish Major General Carl von Horn became the head of the military part and the Swedish diplomat Sture Linnér was responsible for the civilians. Both of them were subject to American Ralph Bunche, who was appointed head of the whole operation.

Air Force 
In September 1961, in response to an appeal by the UN for military support, an initial force of five J 29Bs were stationed in the Republic of Congo, organized as the F 22 Wing of the Swedish Air Force. It was subsequently reinforced by four more J 29Bs and two S 29C photo reconnaissance Tunnans in 1962. The J 29 was the only combat aircraft at the disposal of the UN, the J 29Bs dispatched receiving the UN identifying legend upon their fuselages.

Most of the missions involved attacking ground targets with internal cannons as well as unguided rockets. No aircraft were lost in action despite large amounts of ground fire. The consensus of the crews and foreign observers was that the Tunnan's capabilities were exceptional. (The Katanga secessionists used a few Fouga Magisters and other aircraft with relatively poor air combat capabilities.) The only aircraft lost was by a high-ranking officer who made a trial run and crashed during an aborted takeoff. When ONUC was terminated in 1964, some of the Swedish aircraft were destroyed at their base, since they were no longer needed at home and the cost of retrieving them was deemed excessive.

Army 

From 1960 to 1964, the Swedish Army sent a total of nine battalions to Congo. In the initial stage of the crisis, when whites in the Congo became targets during the riots, Dag Hammarskjöld assessed that it was important that there were white UN troops in the country. He therefore requested that Sweden and Ireland would send a battalion each, with the ulterior motive that they would more easily win the confidence of the whites than soldiers from African states. The first Swedish battalion arrived in Congo directly from Gaza (where it had been deployed under UNEF) on 22 July 1960. Initially, the Swedes patrolled in Leopoldville and guarded N'djili Airport in the city.

Swedes, like other UN troops, found difficulty keeping track of the fluent and rapidly changing political allegiances of the various groups, and the fighting they engaged in did not always have an apparent rational reason. In August, the Swedes moved to Elizabethville in Katanga, where they ended up in their first combat situation and suffered their first loss while escorting a train. The trains, which were carrying Katangan Baluba prisoners, were attacked by BaLuba, an ethnic group who supported the central government against Katanga.

The Swedes had to try to maintain order in a huge camp with approximately 40,000 BaLuba refugees in Kasai which was suddenly formed in just two weeks in 1961, with refugees fleeing Gendarmerie attacks in north Katanga. In 1962, the Swedes moved to the Kamina base, near the town of Kamina. On New Year's Eve 1962, the UN troops advanced towards Kamina, cleared all the gendarmes' roadblocks, and managed to knock down the organized resistance.

The Congo Crisis became by far the most serious international task the Swedish Armed Forces faced during the Cold War, and it was the first time in 140 years that Swedish forces were forced into battle. During the years in Congo, 40 Swedish soldiers were injured and 19 were killed. As late as 2004, it was made public that the corpses of two killed Swedes were eaten by locals, purportedly because cannibalism was believed by certain African groups to be a way to absorb the victim's strength. The event was considered very sensitive by the UN and the Congolese government and the incident was covered up.

A total of 6,334 Swedes served in the Congo during the years 1960–1964, 19 died and many wounded. Eleven soldiers were awarded the Swedish Vasa Medal for "extraordinary courage and commendable action to save human lives". Two soldiers who received this medal were Stig von Bayer and Torsten Stålnacke.

Swedish ONUC Battalions 1960–1964

Information on the Swedish battalions' deployments in the Congo are as follows:

The first Swedish UN battalion in Sinai in 1956 was named Battalion 1. This numbering continued up to Battalion 9 which was initially deployed in the Sinai and later in Gaza. After Battalion 9 the numbering was changed to include only odd numbers starting with 11 and with the additional letter G for Gaza. Battalion 8 was transferred from Gaza to the Congo and then took the name Battalion VIII K (Kongo (Congo)). Ultimately, seven of the Congo battalions, 10 to 22, were recruited to serve in ONUC, while the other two were Gaza battalions transferred to the Congo as reinforcements.

Irish Army 
The Irish Army's first large deployment to the Congo was in 1960. The 32nd Infantry Battalion was the first deployment of Irish troops overseas and they were woefully ill-equipped. The standard uniform was a heavy bullswool tunic and trousers and the service rifle was the .303 Lee–Enfield. Issues with kit were eventually solved, new lightweight uniforms were issued and the FN FAL rifle replaced the Lee–Enfield. The Irish Battalions had a huge area to patrol and not much transport to patrol it with. Most patrols consisted of a couple of Land Rovers or Willys CJ3As, carrying soldiers armed with rifles, Gustav M45 submachineguns and Bren Guns. One such patrol was ambushed at Niemba on 8 November 1960 by Baluba tribesmen. Of the 11 Irish soldiers, 9 were killed and only 2 escaped, while 25 Baluba were also killed in the battle. Trooper Anthony Browne was posthumously awarded the Military Medal for Gallantry (the highest Irish military award) for giving his life to save his comrade. As a result of the ambush, the army equipped its contingent with 8 Ford armoured cars. These had been constructed in Ireland during the Second World War as a stop-gap armoured vehicle. Armament consisted of a single turret-mounted Vickers HMG. Modifications included extra ammunition storage, a searchlight and a cooling fan.

The most famous Irish action of the operation was the Siege of Jadotville where 150 Irish troops of "A" Company, 35th Battalion, held out against a much larger force of 3,000–5,000 Belgian, French, and Rhodesian led Katanga mercenaries and irregulars. The Irish fought until their ammunition ran out, inflicting hundreds of casualties on their opponents while suffering only several wounded. However, an attempt by Irish and Swedish reinforcements to relieve them failed, and in the end, the besieged Irish troops were forced to surrender.

A total of 6,000 Irish soldiers served in the Congo from 1960 until 1964, taking 26 casualties in that time. The Congo deployment resulted in greater investment by the government in personal kit and eventually, armoured personnel carriers.

Canadian Army 

When violence erupted in the Congo, Canada had set aside an infantry brigade especially for the use of the United Nations. When Dag Hammarskjold received the offer to send the Canadian Brigade to the Congo, he refused stating that "If outside help was required to resolve the developing crisis, they preferred non-African states to be used as a last resort." The United Nations did not wish to turn the Congo Crisis into a Cold War proxy war and so tried to pick peacekeepers from neutral countries. This trans-Atlantic country would be Canada, even though as Dr. Spooner put it "Canada: [was] Just West of Neutral". Canadian forces were perfectly suited for a peacekeeping mission in the Congo because they were bilingual, which allowed them to communicate with the mostly English-speaking UN troops as well as the French-speaking Belgian and Congolese forces. They could also communicate with the Congolese people.

All of this occurred prior to there being an official request for assistance from the Congo. The first request for assistance from the Congo requested that the United Nations send technical assistance to support the Force Publique, the armed forces of the Congo. In response, "the secretary general suggested the dispatch of UN technical personnel to the Congo to assist in restoring order and discipline within the armed forces". Canadian National Defence assumed that the United Nations would ask for French-speaking military advisers; the army maintained a standby list of one hundred officers, including many who were bilingual and could be posted abroad on short notice. Before Hammarskjold could put his plan into action, however, a second Congolese request arrived, sent directly to the secretary general from President Joseph Kasa-Vubu and Prime Minister Joseph Lumumba, "the Congolese leaders asked for UN military forces to counter the violent Belgian intervention". Again Canada offered combat troops stating that if the need arose for Canadian military intervention in the Congo Canada could also "deploy one of three French speaking battalions made ready for UN Service". The offer for combat troops was again refused, though Hammarskjold officially accepted the Canadian French-speaking officers. Colonel Jean Berthiaume of the Royal 22e Regiment led the UN effort as the mission's first Chief of staff. Berthiaume was congratulated for his impressive organizational skills, but also for his bravery and for his "initiative, linguistic ability, and special aptitude for negotiating". He became the first Canadian since the 2nd World War to be awarded the rank of Officer of the Order of the British Empire.

It was during this time that the first formal request for troops in the support of the UN mission was given to Canada, the request included Canadian signals and logistics personnel be sent to the Congo. From Canada the UN needed specifically signals personnel as well as quartermaster and maintenance personnel. The Canadian Signallers were to be used to send communication from the front to the headquarters and vice versa. They were stationed both at ONUC HQ as well as in 10 static signals stations spread throughout the country. Canada also sent a Provost Unit which attempted to promote law and order in the capital. "At any one time there were more Canadians serving at ONUC HQ than of any other nationality." In addition to the Signals Squadron, Canada also sent an advanced reconnaissance party consisting of six officers from the United Nations Military Observer Group in India. "These men were instructed to determine personnel and equipment requirements, as well as the organization requirements at HQ." The reconnaissance party found that "ONUC HQ personnel did not carry weapons and were able to move about freely without any trouble." The Canadian government, however, was scared that their French-speaking peacekeepers could get mistaken for Belgian paratroops, and so "peacekeepers were given small arms training ... depending on rank the troops were issued either Browning automatic pistols or C1 submachine guns, weapons the non-combatant peacekeepers carried for personal defence only."

It soon became clear that these fears were not unwarranted, Canadian peacekeepers were attacked by Congolese troops on several occasions. "The first incident of serious violence that occurred between Congolese and Canadians occurred at N'Djili Airport, and demonstrated how vulnerable the Canadians could be. Two groups of peacekeepers were waiting to depart on reconnaissance missions, when those destined for Luluabourg were delayed on the tarmac. A patrol of about ten to twelve Congolese soldiers suddenly rushed them ... the Congolese forced them facedown onto the tarmac, arms extended and then they kicked them." The commanding officer was then knocked out and the remaining Canadian soldiers were herded onto a truck. After about ten minutes the Canadians were rescued by a Danish officer and Ghanain troops. The UN as well as Canada reacted in outrage to this senseless attack against Canadian troops. In turn they praised the Canadian officer for not escalating the situation and responding in due discretion. It was recognized by all parties that the Canadian soldiers were capable of firing on the Congolese troops in self-defence but they did not.

Even though Canada was not in the Congo in a combat capacity, their involvement came under scrutiny from the USSR. The Soviets began to attack Canadian involvement directly, "they objected to the use of Canadian peacekeepers because Canada was one of Belgium's NATO allies". The Soviets even went so far as to demand "the withdrawal of armed groups from Canada". According to Scarnecchia, the Soviets "accused the RCAF of supplying weapons and armoured steel to Tshombe's forces in secessionist Katanga, they believed that this RCAF support was in line with Western interests." Although these allegations were never proven, in response, the Secretary-General of the UN transferred the RCAF contingent from performing airlift duties in support of the UN mission to a Pisa-Leopoldville airlift of food and aid. This transfer served to somewhat satisfy the Russians and any further scrutiny was mild in comparison. Instead of arguing against UN involvement in the Congo, the Soviets began to provide aid to Prime Minister Lumumba in Leopoldville. Along with the assassination of Lumumba and the death of Secretary-General Hammarskjold, this then led to the use of force by UN troops in the Congo being allowed by the UN. In 1961, UN troops under aggressive commanders pushed into Katanga, and began routing Tshombe's armed forces. As "clashes between Tshombe and UN forces grew more frequent, the UN moved even more aggressively, and eventually took control of key parts of the province".

Canadians would play an important role in nearly every aspect of the UN mission in the Congo, from their detachment at Command HQ to the RCAF Pisa-Leopoldville Airlift on to the Signals Personnel stationed throughout the Congo. Though Canadian involvement came under Soviet attack the Canadian commitment to the mission did not waver and Canadian soldiers stayed in the Congo until the end of the mission in 1964. Canadian forces proved themselves admirably in tough situations when they were attacked by Congolese forces and responded with discipline and tact by not firing on their attackers.

The greatest strength which the Canadian Contingent in the Congo reached was 461, though 1,900 Canadian soldiers would serve there from 1960 to 1964. There were no casualties except the bruises and cuts given to the Canadian Forces by Congolese troops at N'Djili Airport.

During the ensuing Congo Crisis, about 1,800 Canadians from 1960 to 1964 served among the 93,000 predominantly African peacekeepers with the United Nations Operation in the Congo (ONUC), working chiefly as communications signallers and delivering via the Royal Canadian Air Force humanitarian food shipments and logistical support. The Canadian participation stemmed more from overwhelming public opinion, and not decisive action on the part of the Diefenbaker government, according to historians Norman Hillmer and Jack Granatstein. However, Diefenbaker reportedly refused to comply with numerous public calls for Canada to provide humanitarian relief to 230,000 Congolese famine victims in South Kasai in 1961 ostensibly because "surplus foodstuffs should be distributed to unemployed persons in Canada" as a first priority. Two Canadians died from non-conflict-related causes, and, out of the 33 Canadians injured in the conflict, twelve received "severe beatings" by Congolese forces. Although Patrice Lumumba dismissed the first incidences of these beatings, on 18 August 1960, as "unimportant" and "blown out of all proportion" in order for the UN to "influence public opinion", he attributed them a day later to the Armée Nationale Congolaise's "excess of zeal". Historians have described these incidents as cases of mistaken identity under chaotic circumstances, in which Canadian personnel were confused by Congolese soldiers with Belgian paratroopers, or mercenaries working for the Katanga secession.

Only a quarter of Canada's signallers extended their six-month tours of duty to a full year, and Canadian forces reportedly found the Congolese to be "illiterate, very volatile, superstitious and easily influenced", including an instance where a Canadian Lieutenant-Colonel successfully persuaded Kivu Province's Prime Minister to accept a relief contingent from Malaysia by explaining to him that the Malaysians were capable of diverting bullets in flight away from their intended path. A recent study concluded that while the Canadian government "demonstrated a greater willingness to accommodate the Congolese prime minister Patrice Lumumba than other Western nations" and publicly did not side with either faction, it "[p]rivately ... favoured the more Western oriented [President] Kasavubu". however financial assistance was turned down by Prime Minister John Diefenbaker. Canada's troops earned the trust of Joseph Mobutu, the latter visiting Canada in 1964 as President of Zaire, during which he acknowledged Canada's support in maintaining his country's territorial integrity.

Ethiopia
Four hundred and sixty Ethiopian troops were among 3,500 UN soldiers to arrive by 20 July 1960. This initial contingent would form the Tekil (or "Tekel") Brigade, which was stationed in Stanleyville. Through the course of the operation, some 3,000 members of the elite Kebur Zabagna (imperial bodyguards)—about 10 percent of the Ethiopian Army's strength at that time—were raised by Emperor Haile Selassie, along with an air force squadron. The Ethiopian 3rd Brigade was distinguished for having provided decisive artillery support in the UN's siege of Kibushi in late 1962/early 1963.

Ghana, Nigeria, Egypt
Ghanaian and Nigerian troops also served in ONUC, the latter with the 99th Indian Infantry Brigade. The Nigerian 1st Battalion was among the last military forces in the country in 1964.

An Egyptian battalion appears to have arrived by September 1960, but left by early 1961 after a dispute about the UN's role. On 26 January 1961, the Secretary-General reported that United Arab Republic (a union of Egypt and Syria) requested that its contingent of roughly 510 personnel be repatriated by 1 February; these troops allegedly comprised a parachute battalion based in Lisala in Equateur Province, where visits of UAR Ilyushin aircraft caused concern among UN officials.

Indonesia
Information on the Indonesian Army contingents' deployments in the Congo are as follows

Force commanders of ONUC
Major-General Carl von Horn, Sweden, July 1960 – December 1960 (transferred from UNTSO)
Lieutenant-General Sean MacEoin, Ireland, January 1961 – March 1962
Lieutenant-General Kebbede Guebre, Ethiopia, April 1962 – July 1963
Major-General Christian Roy Kaldager, Norway, August 1963 – December 1963
Major-General Johnson Aguiyi-Ironsi, Nigeria, January 1964 – June 1964

Legacy
ONUC was the first UN peacekeeping mission to employ force as a means of implementing the decisions of the Security Council. It was also the first mission to enforce a no-fly zone and an arms embargo. As of 2021, it remains the most robust UN operation in terms of scope, scale, and use of force.

During the first three years of its operation, ONUC managed to successfully improve the internal security of the Congo. On the eve of ONUC's departure, Adoula declared over radio that the mission was a "decisive factor" in restoring the Congo's unity and that it set "an encouraging precedent" for intervention in emerging states.

In subsequent years, most Congolese came to view ONUC as an unwelcome foreign interference in their country's affairs.

In popular culture 
The Netflix film The Siege of Jadotville (2016) directed by Richie Smyth is based on Declan Power's book, The Siege at Jadotville: The Irish Army's Forgotten Battle (2005). The film tells the story of the Irish peacekeeping troop that held off Katangese and mercenary troops in the mining town of Jadotville, despite being heavily outnumbered.

References

Bibliography 

 
 
 
 
 Macqueen, Norrie. The United Nations, Peace Operations and the Cold War. London: Routledge, 2017.

 
 
Williams, A Susan. Who Killed Hammarskjöld? : The UN, the Cold War and White Supremacy in Africa. London: C Hurst & Co Publishers Ltd, 2016.
Zeilig, Leo. Patrice Lumumba : Africa's Lost Leader. London: Haus, 2008.

Further reading
 Abi-Saab, G. (1978), The United Nations Operation in the Congo 1960–1964 (Oxford: Oxford University Press). 

 .
 .
 .
 .
 . Controller of Publications, PDD.37(N)/500.
 .
 Gibbs, D. (2000), ‘The United Nations, international peacekeeping and the question of ‘impartiality’: revisiting the Congo operation of 1960’, Journal of Modern African Studies, 38(3): 359–82. online
 Gibbs, David N. (1993) "Dag Hammarskjöld, the United Nations, and the Congo Crisis of 1960–1: a reinterpretation." Journal of Modern African Studies 31.1 (1993): 163–174. online
 Higgins, R. (1980), United Nations Peacekeeping 1946-1967: Documents and Commentary, Vol. III: Africa (London: Oxford University Press).
 Lefever, Ernest W (1967) Uncertain Mandate: Politics of the U.N. Congo Operation (Baltimore, Maryland: The Johns Hopkins University Press; London: Cambridge University Press; Cambridge, UK) xvi and 254 pp. £3 11s. 6d.
 .
 .
 .
 United Nations Security Council document S/4482 (financial aid to the Congo)

External links
Records of the United Nations Operation in the Congo (ONUC) (1960-1964) at the United Nations Archives

United Nations operations in the Democratic Republic of the Congo
History of the Democratic Republic of the Congo
India and the United Nations
Ireland and the United Nations
Military operations involving India
Sweden and the United Nations